Eric's Trip is a Canadian indie rock band from Moncton, New Brunswick. Eric's Trip achieved prominence as the first Canadian band to be signed to Seattle's flagship grunge label Sub Pop in the early 1990s. The band had a minor hit in alternative circles with the single "View Master", from the 1994 album Forever Again.

History
Eric's Trip formed in 1990 when musicians Rick White and Chris Thompson joined Julie Doiron and Ed Vaughan (who was later replaced by Mark Gaudet). They took their name from a Sonic Youth song and developed a unique sound which fused elements of the distorted guitar of Dinosaur Jr., vocal elements of My Bloody Valentine, the folk leanings of Neil Young, and the lo-fi aesthetic of Sebadoh. White described their sound as "sappy melodic pop music on top of thick distortion." Gaudet's description was more succinct: "dreamy punk".

The band released their first album, Love Tara, in 1993.

Eric's Trip went on indefinite hiatus in 1996 and reunited in 2001. They played at the Sappy Records Festival in Sackville, New Brunswick from 2006-2009.  In 2010 both White and Doiron played separate sets at SappyFest. Eric's Trip also played a series of shows in 2007, including a show at the 2007 Halifax Pop Explosion. A two-disc CD tribute album, titled Songs For Eric: A Tribute to Eric's Trip featuring Eric's Trip songs covered by artists influenced by the band,  released by Gooseberry Rcords, in April 2009.

Doiron currently has a successful solo career; in 1999, she recorded the album Julie Doiron and the Wooden Stars with the Ottawa band Wooden Stars, which won a Juno Award for Best Alternative Album of the Year, and from 2003 to 2007 she performed with Shotgun & Jaybird. White and Gaudet play in Elevator, and White has also released three solo albums under the name Rick White Album, The Rick White Album, Memoreaper and 137. Thompson enjoyed some fame as Moon Socket, and currently plays in The Memories Attack with Ron Bates of Moncton band Orange Glass.

White produced Doiron's solo albums Woke Myself Up (2007) and I Can Wonder What You Did with Your Day (2009). Woke Myself Up features three tracks on which the entire Eric's Trip lineup contributed to the recording, their first studio collaboration since the band's 1996 breakup, while I Can Wonder has been described by critics as directly revisiting the sound and style of Eric's Trip for the first time in Doiron's solo career.

Personnel
 Julie Doiron – bass, guitar, vocals
 Chris Thompson – guitar, bass, drums, vocals
 Rick White – vocals, guitar
 Ed Vaughan – drums (1990–1991)
 Mark Gaudet – drums, vocals (1991–present)

Discography

EPs/cassettes
 Eric's Trip cassette (Independent) – Dec 1990
 Catapillars EP cassette (Independent) – Apr 1991
 Drowning EP cassette (Independent) – Aug 1991
 Warm Girl cassette (Independent) – Jan 1992
 Belong 7-inch EP (NIM) – Apr 1992
 Peter cassette/CD (Murderecords), LP (Sub Pop Germany) – Apr 1993
 Songs About Chris 7-inch EP (4 songs) / CD5 (6 songs) (Sub Pop) – May 1993
 Julie and the Porthole to Dimentia 7-inch EP (One solo track by each of the four members) (Sappy Records) – Jul 1993
 Trapped In New York 7-inch EP (Summershine Records) – 1993
 Warm Girl 7-inch EP (Derivative) – 1993
 The Gordon Street Haunting 7-inch EP / CD5 (Sub Pop) – May 1994
 The Road South 7-inch EP (Sonic Unyon) – Aug 1995

Albums
 Love Tara (Sub Pop) – Nov 1993
 Forever Again (Sub Pop) – Sep 1994
 Purple Blue (Sub Pop) – Jan 1996

Live Albums
 The Eric's Trip Show live CD (Teenage USA) – 2001
 Live in Concert November 4th, 2001 live CD (Great Beyond) – 2001
 Live at The Esquire May 1995 live archival digital streaming release (no label) – January 2020
 Live in Montreal - March 16th, 1993 live archival digital streaming release (no label) – October 2022

Splits
 "Laying Blame" b/w Stove-Smother Split 7-inch with Sloan (Cinnamon Toast Records) – 1994
 Pillow (Red) b/w Payday and Don't Spook the Horse... Split 7-inch with Moviola (metoo! records) – 1996

Compilations
 "Sickness" featured on Naked in the Marsh 10-inch Compilation of Moncton bands, 500 copies on green vinyl (NIM) – 1991
 "Understanding" featured on Raw Energy CD Compilation (Raw Energy Records) – 1993
 "Blue Sky for Julie/Smother" featured on Never Mind the Molluscs East Coast Compilation Double 7-inch set/CD (Sub Pop) – 1993
 "Blue Sky for Julie/Smother" featured on Sub Pop Employee of the Month Compilation CD/LP (Sub Pop) – 1993
 "Laying Blame" featured on Trim Crusts if Desired East Coast CD Compilation (Cinnamon Toast Records) – 1994
 "Evie" featured on Not If I Smell You First CD Compilation (Sonic Unyon) – Aug 1995
 "If You Don't Want Me" featured on Teenage Zit Rock Angst Compilation LP/CD/8-track (Nardwuar the Human Serviette/Mint Records) – 1995
 "So Easier Last Time" featured on More of Our Stupid Noise Squirtgun Records - 1996
 "Universe" featured on The Boys Club Soundtrack - 1996
 "New Love" (remix) & "We're Only Gonna Die" (live in Montreal '94) featured on "The Stareoscopic Scary Show - An Audiological View Of
Moncton N.B." (No label, SSSCD 197-2, released independently by Rick White)
 Long Days Ride 'Till Tomorrow (Sappy Records) – 1997

Other
 Bootleg (No Label) – 2007

See also

Music of Canada
Canadian rock
List of Canadian musicians
List of bands from Canada
:Category:Canadian musical groups

References

External links

 Eric's Trip discography at Discogs.
 Eric's Trip official site at Sub Pop
 Great Beyond Recordings record label
 Eric's Trip Live Archive – Guide to Eric's Trip's studio sessions and live concerts, including side-projects.

Musical groups established in 1990
Musical groups disestablished in 1996
Musical groups reestablished in 2006
Musical groups disestablished in 2009
Canadian indie rock groups
Canadian alternative rock groups
Musical groups from Moncton
Sub Pop artists
Canadian noise rock groups
Murderecords artists
1990 establishments in New Brunswick
1996 disestablishments in Canada
2006 establishments in New Brunswick
2009 disestablishments in Canada
Sonic Unyon artists